Alex M. Triantafilou (pronounced tree-aunt-a-FEE-loo) is the chairman of the Ohio Republican Party and former chairman of the Hamilton County Republican Party in Cincinnati, Ohio, United States and "Of Counsel" at the Cincinnati law firm Dinsmore.

Career
Triantafilou worked as an assistant prosecuting attorney for Hamilton County prosecutor Joseph T. Deters.  He also worked in the office of the Hamilton County Clerk of Courts, Greg Hartmann.

Before taking the bench, Triantafilou worked on Republican political campaigns and advised candidates.

In 2005, Triantafilou was appointed and subsequently won election to the Hamilton County Municipal Court.  In 2006, he was appointed to the Hamilton County Court of Common Pleas. Beginning in 2008, he is the current chairman of the Hamilton County Republican Party. Triantafilou also serves as magistrate, hearing cases regularly before the mayors' courts of Newtown and Harrison, Ohio. Triantafilou is also a partner at the law firm of Dinsmore & Shohl.

Personal life
Triantafilou was born and raised in Cincinnati to a family of Greek ancestry. He is a graduate of Oak Hills High School, the University of Cincinnati, and the Salmon P. Chase College of Law. He resides in Green Township, Ohio with his wife Jennifer and has a son, Michael.  He is a parishioner of the Holy Trinity Greek Orthodox Church in Finneytown, Ohio. Triantafilou has been involved in the Ohio Mock Trial program through his alma mater, Oak Hills High School.

Controversy

On April 29, 2009, Triantafilou posted a picture of Senator Arlen Specter, who had recently switched from being a Republican to being a Democrat, on his blog; the picture showed Specter bald after his bout with cancer and compared him to Dr. Evil from the Austin Powers film series.  After receiving criticisms from Democratic leaders, including Tim Burke, the Democratic Party Chairman in Hamilton County, Triantafilou removed the picture and post from his site.

References

External links
 Official Bio at Dinsmore
 Official Hamilton County Republican Party website
 Interview with Alex Triantafilou

1971 births
2016 United States presidential electors
American people of Greek descent
Living people
Ohio lawyers
Ohio Republicans
People from Hamilton County, Ohio
Politicians from Cincinnati
University of Cincinnati alumni